Kathy Linden (born 1938) is an American pop singer from Moorestown Township, New Jersey. She grew up in Burlington, New Jersey.

Linden scored two big hits on the U.S. Billboard Hot 100 late in the 1950s. The first was "Billy", a song originally written in 1911; it hit number seven in 1958. The second was "Goodbye Jimmy, Goodbye", a song written by a radio program director named Jack Vaughn; it rose to number eleven in 1959. Both singles were released on Felsted Records and featured Joe Leahy's backing orchestra. Linden was known for having a breathy, childlike voice, even as a married woman in her 20s.

Linden's talents appeared early. Her first public appearance was as a tap and ballet dancer when she was five years old. Since then, she acted in school plays and musicals, appeared in public pageants, played piano and violin in several local symphony orchestras, and with an all-girl string quintet called the Singing Strings.

She attended the University of New Hampshire Summer Youth Music School in 1954, was a soprano soloist with the All State Chorus in 1955, and studied at the Philadelphia Conservatory of Music.

As featured vocal soloist with the Singing Strings, she appeared in many well-known spots in Philadelphia and New Jersey. She also sang with several local bands.

At 19, she was discovered by record producer and trumpeter Joe Leahy when she auditioned for him. He was so intrigued with her sound that he recorded her and her first release was "It's Just My Luck to Be Fifteen." He transferred her recording contract to Felsted Records, a subsidiary of London Records which had just set up shop that year. She debuted on Felsted with "Billy".

"Goodbye Jimmy, Goodbye" became an international hit, especially in Sweden, where Linden's version peaked at no 3, where it stayed for many weeks in September and October 1959.

After more recordings for Felsted and subsequently Monument and Capitol, some of which became regional hits, Linden retired from show business in 1963 to devote more time to her family and other personal interests.

In 2015, Linden gave her first and only radio interview since her retirement. She told former Casey Kasem interviewer Ronnie Allen that her life had changed enormously around 1980 when she became a Christian and started writing inspirational songs and singing and leading worship at many churches. In 1985, she was interviewed and sang on the Joy Program on TV. In 1992, she made a pilgrimage to Israel and led worship on the boat on the Sea of Galilee. She also led worship in both maximum and minimum security prisons of Southern California for three years.

In 2019, Linden recorded a new album of original inspirational, country and instrumental songs called The Love That's In My Heart, her first release in more than 55 years.

Discography

Albums

Singles

References

External links 
 The Official Kathy Linden website: kathylinden.com
 Kathy Linden 2015 radio interview show with Ronnie Allen (researcher for Casey Kasem)

1938 births
Living people
American women pop singers
Singers from New Jersey
People from Moorestown, New Jersey
21st-century American women